Gołdap  ( or variant Goldapp) is a spa town in northeastern Poland, in the region of Masuria, seat of Gołdap County in the Warmian-Masurian Voivodeship. It is located on the Gołdapa River, between the Szeskie Hills, Gołdap Lake and the Puszcza Romincka forest. It has a population of 15,600.

History

Early history

Masurians began to settle the region in the 16th century while it was part of the Duchy of Prussia, a fief and part of the Kingdom of Poland. Systematic settlement began in 1565, while the town was officially founded by Caspar von Nostitz on May 15, 1570. Located at a profitable location on the crossing of several trade routes near the Prussian border with Lithuania, Gołdap grew rapidly. Its coat of arms depicts the House of Hohenzollern and Brandenburg, while the letter "S" stands for Sigismund II Augustus, King of Poland, who was the suzerain of the region. In 1656, during the Polish-Swedish War, Polish troops under command of Dymitr Jerzy Wiśniowiecki were stationed in Gołdap.

The town became a part of the Kingdom of Prussia in 1701 and Germany in 1871. Between 1757 and 1762 it was occupied by Russians.

From 1709 to 1711 eastern Prussia suffered from a plague. The deceased were replaced by Germans from Brandenburg, Pomerania, Magdeburg, Halberstadt, the Electorate of the Palatinate,  and Nassau, as well as Swiss and Lithuanians. In 1732 Protestants expelled from Salzburg also resettled the area. In the 19th century Gołdap's population consisted mainly of Poles, Lithuanians and Germans, mostly Protestants. Lutheran services took place in all three languages. In 1831, the Polish pastor's house was burnt down.

In 1807, Polish troops of General Jan Henryk Dąbrowski were stationed in the town. In 1863, Poles smuggled weapons through the town to the Russian Partition of Poland to support the January Uprising.

In the 18th and 19th centuries Goldap was a notable centre of commerce and production of various goods for the local market, as well as an important centre of grain production. In 1818 it became a seat of Landkreis Goldap. In 1825, the county (including the town) had 24,911 inhabitants, including (by mother tongue): 17,412 (~70%) German, 3,940 (~16%) Polish and 3,559 (~14%) Lithuanian. In 1879 the town was linked to a railway.

World War I and II

During World War I Goldap was a scene of fierce fighting on the Eastern Front, which passed through the town twice. As a result, it was almost completely destroyed. The town was rebuilt, and soon after the war ended it reached a similar number of inhabitants it had had before.

During World War II Goldap was planned by the German staff as one of the strongholds guarding the rest of East Prussia from the Red Army on the Eastern Front. As a result of heavy fighting for the city and the regions directly east of it, in August and September 1944, 90% of the town was yet again destroyed. According to German war-time reports, about 50 civilians were murdered (some raped) by the Red Army on its initial entry into Goldap in October 1944. It was the first town of Nazi Germany to fall. However, in November 1944 the Wehrmacht reconquered Goldap and would be able to keep it until the end of December of the same year. In January, the German positions in far-eastern East Prussia broke down completely.

Post-war Poland

After the war, the town became again part of Poland under the terms of the Potsdam Conference. The town was renamed to its historic Polish name Gołdap and rebuilt. The town retained its status as a seat of a powiat until 1975, when all powiats were abolished. After their re-establishment in 1999, Gołdap was not restored as a county seat, being instead assigned in the years 1999-2001 to the Olecko-Gołdap County. The town has subsequently reclaimed the original status, following re-establishment of a standalone Gołdap County.

Today the town of Gołdap remains an important centre of local trade and commerce. There are several small food production facilities (milk plant, industrial slaughterhouse, mill) located there, as well as a paper mill and a small tourist equipment works. In addition, it is one of the centres of tourism, with many skiing, swimming, sailing and leisure centres located both in the town and around it.

Sports
The Piękna Góra ski resort is located on the outskirts of Gołdap.

It competes in the lower leagues.

Notable residents
 Johannes Thiele (1860–1935), German zoologist 
 Erich Sack (1887–1943), Protestant Pastor and resistance fighter
 Alfred Partikel (1888–1945?), Painter
 Gotthard Fischer (1891–1969), general
 Sylwester Czereszewski (born 1971) a Polish footballer

International relations

Gołdap is a member of Cittaslow.

Twin towns — sister cities
Gołdap is twinned with:
 Ano Syros, Greece since 2000
 Giv'at Shmuel, Israel
 Stade, Germany
 Šakiai, Lithuania

Former twin towns:
 Gusev, Russia

In March 2022, Gołdap ended its partnership with the Russian city of Gusev as a response to the 2022 Russian invasion of Ukraine.

References

External links

Municipal webpage 
Geschichte der Stadt Goldap 
German documentary movie about Battle of Goldap

Cities and towns in Warmian-Masurian Voivodeship
Gołdap County
Cittaslow
Poland–Russia border crossings
Populated lakeshore places in Poland
Spa towns in Poland